The Office of the Attorney General of Bhutan is the legal arm of the executive branch of the government. It is also the legal adviser of the government and its representative in the judicial system of Bhutan. Under the Constitution of 2008, the Attorney General is appointed by the King of Bhutan on the advice of the Prime Minister. The Office of the Attorney General is codified by the Attorney General Act of 2006, an act of parliament incorporated by the Constitution. Under the Act, the Attorney General also authors and reviews legislation for parliament.

Office of the Attorney General
The Office of the Attorney General was first formed as the "Office of Legal Affairs" in 1999 by the Lhengye Zhungtshog (Council of Ministers) on the recommendation of its Special Task Force on Enhancing Good Governance. The Office of Legal Affairs was formally established by law on April 14, 2000, as the government's central legal agency. In 2000, the Office began to assume the role of prosecutor, until then the purview of the Royal Civil Service Commission Secretariat and the Law and Order Division of the Ministry of Home Affairs. The policies and decisions of the Office were guided during its early years by Terms of Reference issued by the Council of Ministers in 2002.

On June 30, 2006, the Office of Legal Affairs was replaced by the Office of the Attorney General that exists today. The Attorney General Act of 2006 creates an independent Attorney General office responsible for advising the government, representing it in legal matters including law enforcement, and drafting and reviewing legislation.

The Attorney General Act of 2006, wholly incorporated by the Constitution of 2008, tasks the Attorney General with prosecuting crimes, safeguarding the impartiality of the judicial process, and disseminating information about the law among the people. The Attorney General also drafts Bhutanese legislation for submission to parliament, reviews legislation authored in parliament, and advises all levels of government regarding judicial decisions.

The Office of the Attorney General currently codifies its own Prosecution Guidelines for its Prosecution and Litigation Division. When deciding whether to prosecute cases under Bhutanese law, the Prosecution and Litigation Division first evaluates whether there exists a prima facie case – whether the elements of the offense are met. When a prima facie case is established, the matter is subjected to an "Evidential Test" and a "Public Interest Test." The "Evidential Test" requires sufficient to convict the accused, and that "any reasonable judge would, without compunctions, hold the accused guilty." The "Public Interest Test" requires further that such a prosecution would not have an adverse implication on the public.

Divisions of the Office of the Attorney General
The Office of the Attorney General is divided into divisions and sections; these divisions are overseen by the Deputy Attorney General, who reports to the Attorney General:

Administration & Finance Division
Drafting & Review Division: 
Drafting Section; Review Section 
Legal Services Division: 
Domestic Section; International Section
Policy & Planning Division
Prosecution & Litigation Division: 
Civil Section; Criminal Section
Research & IT Division: 
Research Section; IT Section; Library & Documentation Section

List of attorneys general
Prior to June 30, 2006, Attorneys General of Bhutan were known as "Directors of the Office of Legal Affairs."

See also
Law of Bhutan
Judicial system of Bhutan
Constitution of Bhutan

References

External links
Office of the Attorney General online

Judiciary of Bhutan
Law enforcement in Bhutan